Bayard Clarke (March 17, 1815 – June 20, 1884) was a United States representative from New York.

Biography
Born in New York City on March 17, 1815,  Clarke was a member of one of the city's oldest and most prominent families.  He graduated from Geneva College in 1835, studied law, and was admitted to the bar.

From 1836 to 1840 he was attaché to Lewis Cass, United States Minister to France.  While in France he was a student in the Royal Cavalry School.

Upon returning to the United States, Clarke joined the United States Army, receiving a commission as a second lieutenant in the 8th Infantry in March, 1841.  He transferred to the 2nd Dragoons in September, 1841.  During his service Clarke took part in the Seminole Wars in Florida.

Clarke resigned from the army in December, 1843 and practiced law in New York City and Westchester County.  Also in December, 1843 he married Alletta Remsen Lawrence, a member of another prominent New York family.

He was an unsuccessful Whig candidate for election in 1852 to the Thirty-third Congress.  In 1854 he was elected as an Opposition Party candidate to the Thirty-fourth Congress, holding office from March 4, 1855, to March 3, 1857.  He declined renomination as a Republican in 1856 and resumed practicing law.

At the start of the American Civil War, Clarke went to Washington, D.C. to offer his services.  He was commissioned as a colonel, and was an organizer of the 1st New York Cavalry Regiment (Lincoln Cavalry), which was commanded by Carl Schurz,  Clarke, and then Andrew T. McReynolds.

In mid-1861 there were news accounts indicating that Clarke would be commissioned a brigadier general and assigned to command a school for cavalry in Westchester County.  This plan does not seem to have been carried out, since there are no further references to Clarke's promotion or the operation of a cavalry school in Westchester County.

In retirement Clarke lived in England for several years.  He later resided in Florida during the winter and an island on Schroon Lake, New York during the summer.  He died on June 20, 1884, at his summer home, Isola Bella, in Schroon Lake.  He was interred in a vault at First Presbyterian Church Cemetery, Newtown, New York.

His name sometimes appears as "Clark" in contemporary news accounts and other records.

References

External links

Bayard Clarke at Political Graveyard

1815 births
1884 deaths
Politicians from New York City
New York (state) Whigs
Opposition Party members of the United States House of Representatives from New York (state)
New York (state) Republicans
New York (state) lawyers
United States Army officers
Union Army officers
People of New York (state) in the American Civil War
Hobart and William Smith Colleges alumni
19th-century American politicians
19th-century American lawyers